Events in the year 1969 in Taiwan, Republic of China. This year is numbered Minguo 58 according to the official Republic of China calendar.

Incumbents
 President – Chiang Kai-shek
 Vice President – Yen Chia-kan
 Premier – Yen Chia-kan
 Vice Premier – Huang Shao-ku, Chiang Ching-kuo

Events

February
 24 February – Far Eastern Air Transport Flight 104 crash landed in Tainan.

March
 1 March – The establishment of Aero Industry Development Center in Taichung.

July
 1 July – The establishment of National Chung-Shan Institute of Science and Technology in Longtan District, Taoyuan City.

October
 31 October – The official inauguration of CTV Main Channel.

November
 24 November – 75th anniversary of Kuomintang at Taipei City Hall, Taipei.

December
 20 December – 1969 Republic of China National Assembly and legislative election.

Births
 17 January – Hsu Li-ming, acting Mayor of Kaohsiung (2018)
 5 February – Wu Yu-jen, member of Legislative Yuan
 8 February
 Hsieh Ming-yu, singer and songwriter
 John Wu, Magistrate of Taoyuan County (2009-2014)
 26 February
 Nai Hui-fang, former long and triple jump athlete
 Vincent Fang, lyricist
 4 March – Liu Shueh-shuan, composer
 9 March – Liu Chien-kuo, member of Legislative Yuan
 26 March – Jeff Chang, singer
 16 April – Tsai Chi-chang, deputy speaker of Legislative Yuan
 29 May – Qiu Miaojin, former novelist
 1 June – Rene Liu, singer and actress
 24 July – Zero Chou, director and screenwriter
 11 August – Lisa Huang, member of Legislative Yuan (2012–2014)
 16 August – Wei Te-sheng, film director and screenwriter
 20 September – Huang Yee-ling, singer
 19 October – Yi Huan, comic writer
 29 October – Tao Ching-ying, singer and hostess
 23 November – Rao Ching-ling, Magistrate-elect of Taitung County
 12 December – Yao Jen-to, Vice Chairperson and Secretary-General of Straits Exchange Foundation

References

 
Years of the 20th century in Taiwan